1984–85 Albanian Cup was the thirty-third season of Albania's annual cup competition. It began in August 1984 with the First Round and ended in February 1985 with the Final match. The winners of the competition qualified for the 1985-86 first round of the UEFA Europa League. 17 Nëntori were the defending champions, having won their sixth Albanian Cup last season. The cup was won by Flamurtari.

The rounds were played in a two-legged format similar to those of European competitions. If the aggregated score was tied after both games, the team with the higher number of away goals advanced. If the number of away goals was equal in both games, the match was decided by extra time and a penalty shootout, if necessary.

First round
Games were played on August, 1984*

 Results unknown.

Second round
Games were played on January, 1985*

|}

Quarter-finals
In this round entered the 8 winners from the previous round. Games were played on February, 1985.

|}

Semi-finals
In this round entered the four winners from the previous round. Games were played on April, 1985.

|}

Final

References

 Calcio Mondiale Web

External links
 Official website 

Cup
1984–85 domestic association football cups
1984-85